Maria Krasiltseva (born 16 November 1981) is a former pair skater who competed with Alexander Chestnikh and Artem Znachkov for Armenia. With Chestnikh, she placed 19th at the 1998 Winter Olympics. With Znachkov, she placed 20th at the 2002 Winter Olympics.

External links
 
 Pairs on Ice: Krasiltseva / Chestnikh
 Pairs on Ice: Krasiltseva / Znachkov

Armenian figure skaters
Russian female pair skaters
1981 births
Olympic figure skaters of Armenia
Figure skaters at the 1998 Winter Olympics
Figure skaters at the 2002 Winter Olympics
Figure skaters from Moscow
Living people